Kodur-e Bala (also Romanized as Kodūr-e Bālā; also known as Kādar, Kodar, and Kodūr) is a village in Azizabad Rural District, in the Central District of Narmashir County, Kerman Province, Iran. At the 2006 census, its population was 331, in 83 families.

References 

Populated places in Narmashir County